Evony (formerly known as Civony) is an Adobe Flash-based multiplayer online game by American developer Evony LLC with graphic elements reminiscent of other similar real time games and is set in the European medieval time period. Two browser-based versions (Age 1 and Age 2) as well as a mobile version (The King's Return) exist.

Gameplay

Evony is set in a persistent world during the medieval time period in which the player assumes the role of a lord or lady of a city or alliance. A new player is given "beginner's protection," which prevents other players from attacking their cities for a total of 7 days or until a player upgrades the town hall to level 5 or higher. This gives new players the opportunity to accumulate a few resources and troops and get accustomed to the game before other players can attack them.

The player sets tax rate, production and construction. The resources in the game are gold, food, lumber, stone, and iron, and the city's idle population. As with similar games, the player first has to increase the city's population and hourly resource production rates as well as construction of certain buildings in the city, and then start building resource fields of their city and building an army. An army can include siege machines, such as ballistas, catapults, and battering rams, and foot troops, such as archers, warriors and swordsmen.

All of Evony items must be purchased with gems which can be bought with real money, through its item shop in game or won at the wheel. Some items will accelerate the player's progression through the game. Winning items in battle is the primary way to acquire resources and cities.

Interaction
The game features player versus player game play making it possible to attack another player's cities making it almost impossible for players who have not formed or joined alliances to survive. 

The game allows the player to control up to ten cities through gain of titles. To gain a title, a certain rank is necessary. Both Title and Rank require Medals gained by use of in-game coins to purchase medal boxes, by attacking valleys or winning medal boxes from spinning the wheel.

The game has two different monetary systems. The in-game monetary system revolves around gold. Gold can be obtained by completing quests, by taxing the city's population as well as attacking NPC's. It is also possible to sell resources for gold on the marketplace or to trade resources with other players within a player's alliance for gold. A player can also use real money to buy game cents with which to purchase items and resources from the in-game shop.

Reception 

The Guardian noted that Evony 2009 ad campaign featured women, increasingly unclothed, which had no connection to the game. In 2009 Gavin Mannion commented that Evony "latest ad is seriously pushing boundaries of what is acceptable to publish on Google". Other ads used stock photographs from pornographic DVD covers. Evony promoted the game via "millions of spam comments" and the company denied responsibility.
In 2009, Evony's lawyers sent a cease and desist letter to blogger Bruce Everiss after he alleged deceptive marketing. In March 2010, two days into the case, Evony withdrew its claims.

References

External links

 

2009 video games
Browser games
Browser-based multiplayer online games
Fantasy video games
Flash games
Massively multiplayer online real-time strategy games
Video games developed in the United States
Video games set in Europe
Video games set in the Middle Ages
Video games with isometric graphics
Virtual economies